Sulphide Creek is a  glacial tributary of the Baker River in Whatcom County in the U.S. state of Washington, draining a steep and narrow canyon on the southeast flank of Mount Shuksan, inside North Cascades National Park. Although called a creek, it is river-like due to its high volume. The creek is fed by the "massive" Sulphide and Crystal glaciers above Sulphide Lake and it runs east collecting several small tributaries before flowing into the Baker River at elevation . There are several very tall waterfalls occurring on the creek and its tributaries, the largest of which is Sulphide Creek Falls.

Name
"Sulphide" is the British English spelling of sulfur. The creek was named for minerals that occur naturally in the area. During the 1950s molybdenite (molybdenum disulfide) was prospected near the headwaters of the North Fork of Sulphide Creek, although the deposit was described as having "no economic value".

Course
According to Canyoneering Northwest, the Sulphide Creek canyon has had "no record of descent or exploration".

At the base of Sulphide Creek Falls, an unnamed tributary (which forms a high waterfall of its own) joins from the west. The creek then turns to the east and is joined from the north by another unnamed tributary whose basin forms four notable waterfalls – Seahpo Peak Falls, Cloudcap Falls, Jagged Ridge Falls and Rockflow Canyon Falls.

The creek then continues generally southeast for about  through thick avalanche brush and forest until it joins the Baker River, upstream of Blum Creek and the Baker Lake reservoir.

See also
Blum Basin Falls
List of rivers of Washington
Swift Creek

References

Rivers of Washington (state)
North Cascades of Washington (state)
Rivers of Whatcom County, Washington
North Cascades National Park